Sir Fairfax Leighton Cartwright  (20 July 1857 – 9 January 1928) was a British author and diplomat who became ambassador to the Austro-Hungarian empire before World War I.

Life
Cartwright was the second son of William Cornwallis Cartwright MP for Oxfordshire and his wife Clementine Gaul. He became a diplomat and in the 1880s wrote verse tragedies and other works. From 1899 to 1902 he was secretary to the legation in Mexico and from August 1902 to 1905 secretary to the legation in Lisbon. He was councillor to the Madrid Embassy from 1905 to 1906. From 1906 to 1908 he occupied the combined posts of British Minister to Bavaria and Württemberg.

In 1908 he was made Privy Councillor and he reached the pinnacle of his career as British Ambassador to Austria-Hungary where he remained until 1913. Cartwright tried with the help of the French ambassador, Philippe Crozier, to weaken Austria's dependence on Germany. In 1911 Austria-Hungary wanted to modernise their armed forces, and asked the French to supply a huge loan to help do this. The French government opposed it because Austria-Hungary was not part of the Triple Entente. Fairfax and Crozier realised that Austria-Hungary did not wish to be attached absolutely to their alliance with Germany, and tried to change the mind of the French government to support Austria-Hungary. Had they had succeeded, it might have averted the First World War.  In 1913 Fairfax wrote "Some day Serbia will set Europe by the ears and bring about a universal war on the continent."  He believed that Archduke Franz Ferdinand was a certifiable maniac, and was not fit to inherit the empire, and told his government so.

Cartwight married Donna Maria dei Marchesi Chigi-Zondadari, daughter of an Italian senator on 16 October 1898. They turned the British embassy in Vienna from an undistinguished one into one of the most fashionable. In 1911 an international incident nearly took place involving Lady Cartwright. While she was dancing with the Austrian Foreign Minister, the Russian ambassador cut in and a vicious feud started between the two men.

Works
Lorello. A play in five acts. In verse 1884
Bianca Capello. A tragedy. In verse 1886
The Baglioni. A tragedy. In verse 1888
Olga Zanelli. A tale of an imperial city 1890. This is a three-volume fictional work which recounted seedy adulteries among figures in high society whose identities were faintly disguised. After all his friends in diplomatic circles begged him to withdraw the book immediately, he managed to recover nearly all the 1500 copies printed.
The Mystic Rose from the Garden of the King. A Fragment of the Vision of Sheikh Haji Ibrahim of Kerbela 1898

References

External links
National Portrait Gallery – Sir Fairfax Leighton Cartwright

1857 births
1928 deaths
Ambassadors of the United Kingdom to Austria-Hungary
Knights Grand Cross of the Order of St Michael and St George
Knights Grand Cross of the Royal Victorian Order
Members of the Privy Council of the United Kingdom